The 2016–17 Slovenian Football Cup was the 26th edition of the Slovenian Football Cup, Slovenia's football knockout competition. Maribor were the defending champions, having won their ninth cup title in the 2015–16 edition.

Competition format

Qualified teams

2015–16 Slovenian PrvaLiga members
Celje
Domžale
Gorica
Koper
Krka
Krško
Maribor
Olimpija
Rudar Velenje
Zavrč

Qualified through MNZ Regional Cups
2015–16 MNZ Celje Cup: Brežice and Šmarje pri Jelšah
2015–16 MNZ Koper Cup: Jadran Dekani and Postojna
2015–16 MNZG-Kranj Cup: Triglav Kranj and Žiri
2015–16 MNZ Lendava Cup: Nafta 1903 and Turnišče
2015–16 MNZ Ljubljana Cup: Dob and Radomlje
2015–16 MNZ Maribor Cup: Lenart and Dravograd
2015–16 MNZ Murska Sobota Cup: Beltinci and Bogojina
2015–16 MNZ Nova Gorica Cup: Brda and Tolmin
2015–16 MNZ Ptuj Cup: Aluminij and Videm

Participating teams sorted by league

Bracket

First round
Domžale, Gorica, Maribor and Olimpija joined the competition in the Second round (round of 16).

Round of 16
The draw for the round of 16 was held on 19 August 2016 at the Football Association of Slovenia headquarters in Kranj. In this phase of the competition the 12 clubs who advanced from the first round were joined by Domžale, Gorica, Maribor and Olimpija.

Quarter-finals

First leg

Second leg

Semi-finals

First leg

Second leg

Final

References
General

Specific

Slovenian Football Cup seasons
Cup
Slovenia